Carl Zimmer (born 1966) is a popular science writer, blogger, columnist, and journalist who specializes in the topics of evolution, parasites, and heredity. The author of many books, he contributes science essays to publications such as The New York Times, Discover, and National Geographic. He is a fellow at Yale University's Morse College and adjunct professor of molecular biophysics and biochemistry at Yale University. Zimmer also gives frequent lectures and has appeared on many radio shows, including National Public Radio's Radiolab, Fresh Air, and This American Life.

Zimmer describes his journalistic beat as "life" or "what it means to be alive". He is the only science writer to have a species of tapeworm named after him (Acanthobothrium zimmeri). Zimmer's father is Dick Zimmer, a Republican politician from New Jersey, who was a member of U.S. House of Representatives from 1991 to 1997.

Career
Zimmer received a B.A. in English from Yale University in 1987. In 1989, he started his career at Discover magazine, first as a copy editor and fact checker, eventually serving as a senior editor from 1994 to 1998. Zimmer left Discover after ten years to focus on books and other projects. In 2004, he started a blog called "The Loom", in which he wrote about topics related to his  books, but later expanded it into what he terms "a place where I could write about things I might not be turning into an article for a magazine, but were really interesting'. The Loom has been hosted by Discover and National Geographic for many years, and has been invited to be part of Scienceblogs. It was transferred to Zimmer's personal website in 2018. Zimmer writes a weekly column called "Matter" in The New York Times. Zimmer and the STAT team have put out "Game of Genomes", a 13-part series that enlisted two dozen scientists, with the goal of exploring Zimmer's own genome.

He has given lectures at universities, medical schools, and museums. In 2009, Zimmer was the keynote speaker at Northeast Conference on Science and Skepticism (NECSS). He also presented at NECSS 2011 and CSICon 2018. Zimmer has twice been a spotlight speaker at the Aspen Ideas Festival, in 2017 and 2018. In 2009 and 2010 he was host of the periodic audio podcast "Meet the Scientist" of the American Society for Microbiology. Zimmer's 2004 article "Whose Life Would You Save?" was included in the 2005 The Best American Science and Nature Writing series.

Zimmer has received a number of awards, including the 2007 National Academies Communication Award, a prize for science communication from the United States National Academy of Sciences, for his wide-ranging coverage of biology and evolution in newspapers, magazines, and his blog. In 2016 Yale University appointed Zimmer Adjunct Professor of Molecular Biophysics and Biochemistry, stating that he is "a world-renowned science journalist and teacher, and his ability to make science, particularly biology, accessible to the general public is without peer". Zimmer has taught a science communication course at Yale since 2017 and participates in other molecular biophysics and biochemistry courses.

Opinions on science and skepticism
Zimmer has publicly expressed his concerns about science denial, noting that attacks on science "are in a number of cases well-funded campaigns, and some politicians are backing some of them for their own political ends", where "climate change, evolution, and vaccines seem to top the list". He says that each case of science denial is concerning, and that some, e.g. spreading misinformation about vaccines to worried parents, lead to needless outbreaks of disease that even puts children at risk of death. Similarly, Zimmer considers global warming as one of the biggest societal issues of our time, as our children and their children will inherit not only our genes, but this planet too, and states that "We should think about tinkering with the future of genetic heredity, but I think we should also be doing that with our environmental heredity and our cultural heredity." According to Zimmer there is a broader threat of these particular attacks on science, potentially eroding people's understanding of how science works in general: "If people come to see science as just someone else's opinion, rather than a powerful way of knowing based on evidence, then all sorts of trouble may arise."

In his keynote talk at Rockefeller University on September 6, 2017, he noted that democracy, science and journalism are "three valuable institutions that have made life...far better than it would have been without them." He stated however that we should not take it for granted that they are free from corruption, and urged to keep them that way. Specifically, he stated that "We can look back through history and see how in different places and in different times, each of these pillars cracked and sometimes fell. We should not be smug, when we look back at these episodes. We should not be so arrogant, as to believe that we are so much smarter or nobler that we're somehow immune from this disasters." Zimmer is critical of politicians' negative influence on science. He has been critical of Trump's anti-science stance, specifically his denial of human-caused climate change. Similarly, he is critical of Trump's appointment of science-deniers to lead crucial U.S. environmental agencies, such as National Aeronautics and Space Administration (NASA), the Environmental Protection Agency (EPA), and the Department of Energy. Zimmer is also critical of Putin's influence on Russian science, specifically his "friendly take-over" of a Russian science magazine, Putin being the "hands-off chairman" of the Russian Geographical Society.

After publishing She Has Her Mother's Laugh: The Powers, Perversions, and Potential of Heredity, Zimmer was asked for his opinion about genome editing and CRISPR. While Zimmer thought that some gene-editing procedures, especially for conditions caused by single gene mutations, might provide simple ways to battle serious diseases, he urged for caution about intervention at the embryonic stage. However, he further pointed out the complexity of the issue and the need to address other countries' practices.

Fellowships
 2002: John Simon Guggenheim Memorial Foundation Fellowship.
 2005: Poynter Fellowship, Yale University. Invited speaker, Psychology.
 2006: Alfred P. Sloan Foundation Grant for Public Understanding of Science and Technology
 2010: Poynter Fellowship, Yale. Invited speaker, Molecular Biophysics and Biochemistry
 2015: Osher Fellowship, California Academy of Sciences
 2017: Alfred P. Sloan Foundation Grant for Public Understanding of Science and Technology

Honors

 1994: Everett Clark/Seth Payne Award for Young Science Journalists, awarded "to encourage young science writers by recognizing outstanding reporting and writing in any field of science."
 1997: American Institute of Biological Sciences's Media Award that "recognizes outstanding reporting on biology to a general audience."
 1999: The Pan American Health Organization's Award for Excellence in International Health Reporting
 2004, 2009, 2012: American Association for the Advancement of Science's Science Journalism Award, awarded to honor "professional journalists for distinguished reporting on the sciences, engineering, and mathematics".
 2007: National Academies of Sciences, Engineering, and Medicine's Science Communication Award, awarded to "recognize excellence in reporting and communicating science, engineering, and medicine to the general public", in the category Newspaper/magazine/internet
 2015: National Association of Biology Teachers's (NABT) Distinguished Service Award, awarded to "recognize teachers for their expertise in specific subject areas, for contributions to the profession made by new teachers, and to recognize service to NABT, life science teaching, or leadership in learning communities."
 2016: Society for the Study of Evolution's The Stephen Jay Gould Prize, awarded "to recognize individuals whose sustained and exemplary efforts have advanced public understanding of evolutionary science and its importance in biology, education, and everyday life in the spirit of Stephen Jay Gould." 
2017: Online News Association's Online Journalism Award, awarded in the explanatory reporting category.
 2019: Science in Society Journalism Awards from the National Association of Science Writers for his book, She Has Her Mother's Laugh: The Powers, Perversions, and Potentials of Heredity.
 2021: Asteroid 212073 Carlzimmer, discovered by astronomers with the Mount Lemmon Survey in 2005, was named in his honor. The  was announced by the International Astronomical Union on 16 June 2021.

Bibliography

Books
 
 
 
 
 
 
 
 The Descent of Man: The Concise Edition. Carl Zimmer, Charles Darwin and Frans DeWaal, 2007  (electronic book)
 Microcosm: E. coli and the New Science of Life  London : William Heinemann Ltd., 2008 
 The Tangled Bank: An Introduction to Evolution. Roberts, 2009, 
 Brain Cuttings: Fifteen Journeys Through the Mind. Independent Publishers Group, 2010,  
 More Brain Cuttings: Further Explorations of the Mind. New York : Scott & Nix, Inc., 2011  
 A Planet of Viruses (2011) 
 Science Ink: Tattoos of the Science Obsessed  (2011) 
 Science Ink: Tattoos of the Science Obsessed. Reprint. Sterling: New York, 2014. 
 A Planet of Viruses. 2nd ed. University of Chicago Press: Chicago, 2015. 
 Evolution: Making Sense of Life. co-authored with Douglas Emlen. Roberts and Company; Greenwood Village, Colorado, 2016 
 She Has Her Mother's Laugh: The Powers, Perversions, and Potential of Heredity. Dutton: New York, New York, 2018  
 Life's Edge: The Search for What It Means to Be Alive New York: Dutton, 2021.

Essays and chapters

Critical studies and reviews of Zimmer's work
She has her mother's laugh

References

External links

Carl Zimmer official website
Phenomena: The Loom  Zimmer's blog at National Geographic
List of video conversations and debates with Zimmer and others on Bloggingheads.tv
Color images of viruses from his book, A Planet of Viruses
Career advice for those looking to get into science journalism offered by Carl Zimmer 

1966 births
Living people
American science writers
Discover (magazine) people
Jewish American writers
National Geographic people
Science bloggers
Yale College alumni